Tasmanocephalus is an extinct genus from a well-known class of fossil marine arthropods, the trilobites. It lived during the early part of the Arenig stage of the Ordovician Period, a faunal stage which lasted from approximately 478 to 471 million years ago. Fossils of the genus have been reported from the Karmberg and Caroline Creek Formations of Tasmania, Australia.

References 

Ptychopariida
Ordovician trilobites of Australia
Fossil taxa described in 1936